The Willow Beach National Fish Hatchery is administered by the U.S. Fish and Wildlife Service, located approximately 45 miles (72.4 km) South East of Las Vegas, Nevada, in Mohave County, Arizona on the Arizona side of the  Colorado River twelve miles (~19 km) south of the Hoover Dam.

History
The Willow Beach Hatchery was constructed in 1959 to take advantage of the cold water flowing from Hoover Dam to raise rainbow trout.  The hatchery stocked Rainbow trout at Willow Beach, below Davis Dam and in waters on tribal lands along the Colorado river, as many as 175,000 per year.

In 2013 vegetation clogged cold water intake pipes that brought water from the Colorado River causing the loss of nearly 61,000 trout in August and November.

References

External links
 Willow Beach National Fish Hatchery – U.S. Fish and Wildlife Service

Buildings and structures in Mohave County, Arizona
National Fish Hatcheries of the United States
Tourist attractions in Mohave County, Arizona
Agricultural buildings and structures in Arizona
1959 establishments in Arizona